Rian Michael S. Ayonayon (born December 8, 1992) is a Filipino basketball player for the Blackwater Bossing of the Philippine Basketball Association (PBA). He was drafted 3rd overall pick in the 1st round of the 2019 PBA draft.

Professional career

NLEX Road Warriors (2020–2021)
Ayonayon was drafted third during the first round of the 2019 PBA draft.

Blackwater Bossing (2021–present)
On November 16, 2021, he was traded to the Blackwater Bossing along with Will McAloney in exchange for Marion Magat.

PBA career statistics

As of the end of 2022–23 season

Season-by-season averages

|-
| align=left | 
| align=left |NLEX
| 11 || 18.6 || .296 || .214 || .647 || 2.5 || 2.4 || .4 || .1 || 5.4
|-
| align=left rowspan=2| 
| align=left | NLEX
| rowspan=2|11 || rowspan=2|7.7 || rowspan=2|.286 || rowspan=2|.125 || rowspan=2|.778 || rowspan=2|1.1 || rowspan=2|.8 || rowspan=2|.1 || rowspan=2|.1 || rowspan=2|2.2
|-
| align=left | Blackwater
|-
| align=left | 
| align=left | Blackwater
| 26 || 11.1 || .435 || .345 || .652 || 1.1 || 1.2 || .6 || .0 || 5.2
|-class=sortbottom
| align="center" colspan=2 | Career
| 48 || 12.0 || .369 || .286 || .673 || 1.4 || 1.4 || .4 || .0 || 4.5

References

External links
PBA.ph profile

1992 births
Living people
Basketball players from Rizal
Blackwater Bossing players
Maharlika Pilipinas Basketball League players
Filipino men's basketball players
NLEX Road Warriors draft picks
NLEX Road Warriors players
PCU Dolphins basketball players
People from Antipolo
Point guards
Shooting guards